SensoMotoric Instruments (SMI) was a German provider of dedicated computer vision applications with a major focus on eye tracking technology. SMI was founded in 1991 as a spin-off from academic and medical research at the Free University of Berlin. The company has its headquarters in Teltow near Berlin, Germany, offices in Boston, Massachusetts and San Francisco, California, in the United States, and a worldwide distributor and partner network.

SMI provided eye tracking systems for scientific research, professional solutions and OEM applications. The eye trackers can be combined with motion tracking systems, EEG, and other biometric data. They can be integrated into virtual reality CAVEs, head-mounted displayssuch as Google Glass or Oculus Rift, simulators, cars, or computers as a measurement or interaction modality.

History 

The company was founded by Dr. Winfried Teiwes in 1991. SMI's first system 3D VOG was employed by the ESA, the NASA and on board of the Russian space station Mir to analyze the effect of space missions on gravity-responsive torsional eye movements of astronauts. Gradually, the company shifted its focus from astronautics towards ophthalmology and scientific research. Dr. Teiwes remained the company's Managing Director until 2008, when Eberhard Schmidt took over this role. After the sale of the ENT productline to Interacoustics the diagnostics arm of William Demant Group in 2001, the spin-out of the retinal treatment activities into OD-OS in 2008, and the sale of the Ophthalmic division to Alcon in 2012, the company focused on scientific and professional eye tracking research solutions, virtual reality applications, and OEM integrations.

Technology and Products 

The technology is based on the dark pupil and corneal reflection tracking: The cameras in the SMI eye trackers detect face, eyes, pupils, as well as the corneal reflections from the infrared light sources, and calculate eye movements, gaze direction and points of regard. The sampling frequency of the eye trackers ranges from 30 Hz up to the kHz range.

On the hardware side, the company has three main product lines: mobile Eye Tracking Glasses (ETG), remote eye tracking systems (RED), and tower-mounted systems (Hi-Speed).

The software for experimental design and data analysis is called Experiment Suite and comes in different packages depending on the user's research interests.

Partnerships 

At the 2014 Game Developers Conference, Sony unveiled the prototype InFamous: Second Son game for PlayStation 4, using SMI's RED-oem eye tracking system.

At the CES 2016, SMI demoed a new 250 Hz eye tracking system and a working foveated rendering solution. It resulted from a partnership with camera sensor manufacturer Omnivision who provided the camera hardware for the new system.

In 2015 DEWESoft together with SMI integrated the Eye Tracking Glasses into a driver machine monitoring and analysis platform for advanced driver-assistance systems (ADAS).

In 2014 Red Bull started using the Eye Tracking Glasses as part of their Red Bull Surf Science project. At the Game Developers Conference 2014, Sony unveiled the prototype of PlayStation 4 game Infamous: Second Son with the RED-oem eye tracking system integrated into it.

In 2013 TechViz integrated SMI's 3D Eye Tracking Glasses with TechViz 3D visualization software to enable eye tracking in a virtual reality CAVE. The 3D Eye Tracking Glasses were developed in partnership with Volfoni. In the same year, WorldViz started cooperating with SMI to enable calculation of intersects of gaze vectors with 3D objects and saving the data in one common database for deeper analysis. German Research Center for Artificial Intelligence (DFKI) used the Eye Tracking Glasses to create Talking Places the prototype of an interactive city guide.

In 2012, in partnership with Emotiv SMI developed a software package that combined the EEG data from the Emotiv EEG Neuroheadset with the eye tracking data. Neuromarketers can use this software to analyze consumer reactions to brands according to visual and emotional cues. Prentke Romich Company integrated SMI's NuEye eye-gaze accessory into its speech-generating platform for people with disabilities. The system allows users to control a communication device using only their eyes. Visual Interaction offers myGaze eye tracking accessory based on SMI technology with selected software packages for assistive applications.

Acquisition 

It was reported that Apple acquired SMI in June 2017.

Awards 
In 1992, SMI won the Berlin and Brandenburg Innovation Prize.

In 2009, SMI's iView X RED system received the iF Product Design Award.

See also 
Biopac
Emotiv
Eye tracking
Video-oculography
Visual perception

References 

Information technology companies of Germany
Data analysis software
Data collection in research
Companies based in Brandenburg
Physiological instruments
Vision